= Suzanne Barber =

American engineer

Suzanne Barber is an American engineer who is currently the AT&T Foundation Endowed Professor in the Department of Electrical and Computer Engineering at the University of Texas at Austin.
